The N. A. Jacobsen Building is a historic two-story building in Payette, Idaho. It was designed by architect John E. Tourtellotte, and built in 1908 for N. A. Jacobsen. It has been listed on the National Register of Historic Places since November 17, 1982.

References

National Register of Historic Places in Payette County, Idaho
Commercial buildings completed in 1908
1908 establishments in Idaho